This is a list of European countries by life expectancy.

Life expectancy by country (World Bank Group, 2020)
List of countries by life expectancy at birth for 2020 according to the World Bank Group. The data is filtered according to the list of countries in Europe. In the World Bank Group list and, accordingly, in this list, there are no mini-states with a population of several tens of thousands of people (Andorra, Monaco, San Marino, Vatican City). The values in the World Bank Group tables are rounded. All calculations are based on raw data, so due to the nuances of rounding, in some places, illusory inconsistencies of indicators arose, with a size of 0.01 year.

Life expectancy by country (World Bank Group, 2019)

For comparison, life expectancy at birth for 2019 according to the World Bank Group.

Life expectancy by country (WHO, 2019)
List of countries by life expectancy for 2019 according to the World Health Organization. The data is filtered according to the list of countries in Europe. In the WHO list and, accordingly, in this list, there are no mini-states with a population of several tens of thousands of people (Andorra, Liechtenstein, Monaco, San Marino, Vatican City).

Map (2018)
The map and table below cites life expectancy per country from The World Bank's 2018 statistics. Hotter colours indicate lower life expectancy, colder colours indicate high life expectancy.

Life expectancy by country (2016)

See also

Plotted maps

References

life expectancy
Europe